Wantage Hall, built 1908, is the oldest hall of residence at the University of Reading, in Reading, England. The hall is one of 13 belonging to the University and is close to Whiteknights Campus. It is designated a grade II listed building, a status given for its special architectural or historic interest.

The hall provides fully catered residential accommodation for about 245 students.

History
Wantage Hall was built in 1906–1908 by Harriet, Lady Wantage in memory of her husband Robert Loyd-Lindsay, 1st Baron Wantage, and was the first residential hall of the University, at that time an extension college of Christ Church, Oxford. The architect was Charles Steward Smith, and the hall was laid out as a quadrangle and built in Neo-Tudor style in red brick with stone details.

Wantage Hall was used by the No 1 School of Military Aeronautics during the First World War for training flight instructors, cadet pilots and observers. During World War II, it was the headquarters of RAF Reserve Command.

In 1970 an extension of little architectural interest was built to the north, also in red brick. This was called "New Court", and the original structure became "Old Court".

Gallery

References

External links

Buildings and structures completed in 1908
Buildings and structures of the University of Reading
Grade II listed buildings in Reading
1908 establishments in England